Seven Years: 1998–2005 is a compilation album released by German DJ André "ATB" Tanneberger, in 2005. It contains all singles of ATB and six new tracks.

Three of the new tracks were released as singles: "Humanity" with vocals by Tiff Lacey, a reworked version of "Let U Go" with vocals by Jan Löchel and "Believe in Me" with Löchel on guitar and vocals.
There is also a bonus DVD which includes all videos, a film documenting the "Making of I Don't Wanna Stop" and interviews. Commercially, Seven Years sold 18,000 units in Poland as of 2005.

Track listing

References

External links
 

ATB albums
2005 compilation albums